Laothoe populetorum is a species of moth of the  family Sphingidae. It is found in Kyrgyzstan. It is mostly treated as a variety or form of Laothoe populi.

References

Laothoe (moth)
Moths described in 1887